Shingler is an unincorporated community in Worth County, in the U.S. state of Georgia.

History
The Georgia General Assembly incorporated Shingler as a town in 1912. The town's municipal charter was repealed in 1924.

References

Former municipalities in Georgia (U.S. state)
Unincorporated communities in Georgia (U.S. state)
Unincorporated communities in Worth County, Georgia